The 2011 Dunlop MSA British Touring Car Championship was the 54th British Touring Car Championship (BTCC) season.

Cars conforming to the Next Generation Touring Car (NGTC) specification were allowed to compete in the championship for the first time, in a phased transition from Super 2000 specification to the NGTC specification. The season was also the final time that cars built to the BTC Touring specification were allowed to compete, ending the specification's decade of competition in the BTCC.

Team Dynamics' Matt Neal claimed his third BTCC title after finishing 8th in the final round of the season, two places ahead of teammate and rival Gordon Shedden, who was beaten to the title by eight points. Reigning Champion Jason Plato finished third after suffering a puncture in the first race of the final meeting at Silverstone. With the Hondas claiming a 1–2, this all but eliminated Plato from the title fight.

Joint fourth in the outright championship were Independents' title protagonists Mat Jackson and James Nash, with Jackson finishing fourth on merit of race wins, four to Nash's one. Nash, however, claimed the Independents' title in the first race at Silverstone after Jackson also suffered a puncture. Both however had torrid races after, failing to score points in both races. Nash's team, Triple 8 Race Engineering also claimed the Independents Teams' championship.

With Neal and Shedden first and second in the Drivers' championship, Honda easily clinched both the Teams' and Manufacturers' championships.

Teams and drivers
The entry list for the 2011 season was revealed at the championship's Media Day held at Silverstone on 24 March 2011.

Driver changes
 Changed teams
 Andy Neate will move from West Surrey Racing to partner Tom Chilton at Team Aon.
 Tom Onslow-Cole will move from Team Aon to race for AmD Milltek Racing with YourRacingCar.
 After driving for his own team in 2010, David Pinkney will drive an Audi for Rob Austin Racing.

 Entering/re-entering BTCC
 Nick Foster will début in the series, partnering Rob Collard at West Surrey Racing.
 Tony Gilham will enter the series after three years in the Porsche Carrera Cup Great Britain, with Triple 8.
 Having competed for Motorbase Performance in the Porsche Carrera Cup Great Britain, Liam Griffin will step up into the championship.
 Tony Hughes will enter the series with Speedworks Motorsport, having driven for the team in the Ginetta G50 Cup.
 Chris James, who previously raced in the Mini Challenge, will race for his own Team ES Racing.
 Renault Clio Cup champion Dave Newsham moved into the BTCC with Geoff Steel Racing.
 Jeff Smith will move into the series full-time – having finished eighth in the Renault Clio Cup – after contesting the Knockhill round for Triple 8 in 2010. He will join Pirtek Racing.
 Ginetta G50 Cup champion Frank Wrathall will also graduate into the championship with his family-run Dynojet team.

 Leaving BTCC
 Shaun Hollamby will revert to a team principal role within the AmD Milltek Racing with YourRacingCar team.
 Steven Kane will move into sportscars, racing in the SPEED EuroSeries with HMR.

Team changes
 Rob Austin will enter the series, with his own team running two Audi A4s to NGTC specification.
 Dynojet will enter the series, running a single NGTC Toyota Avensis.
 Speedworks Motorsport will enter the series, becoming the first team to commit to the new Next Generation Touring Car, running two cars.
 Motorbase Performance will switch from BMWs to Fords, running under the Airwaves Racing banner.
 Geoff Steel will enter the series running a BMW for Dave Newsham.

Mid-season changes
 Driver changes
 After originally joining the series as team principal of his own team, Rob Austin made his début at Donington Park replacing David Pinkney, due to the latter's business commitments.
 During the fourth round at Oulton Park, Tom Onslow-Cole left AmD Milltek Racing with YourRacingCar and later announced a return to Team Aon alongside Tom Chilton and Andy Neate.
 Prior to the Oulton Park round Dave Newsham left Geoff Steel Racing and moved to Special Tuning Racing.
 Shaun Hollamby made a return for one round at Croft for his own team AmD Milltek Racing with YourRacingCar. From Snetterton and onwards Martin Byford took the seat.
 Daniel Welch entered the series with his family-run team Welch Racing running NGTC Proton Gen-2 from Snetterton and onwards.
 After Snetterton Tony Gilham left Triple 8 and at Rockingham he returned with GSR.
 Árón Smith made his series début, replacing Gilham at Triple 8 for the round at Knockhill only.
 Michael Caine made his series début at Rockingham for Airwaves Racing, after six years racing in the Porsche Carrera Cup Great Britain.
 Ollie Jackson entered for the final 2 rounds of the season with Triple 8.
 James Thompson returned for the final round at Silverstone with Airwaves Racing, replacing Caine.
 John Thorne entered the series with Thorney Motorsport.

 Team changes
 Geoff Steel Racing were absent from Truxton to Rockingham after failing to secure a replacement for the departed Newsham. From Rockingham Tony Gilham was the sole entry for the team, inclung NGTC engine swap for the final round.
 Welch Motorsport entered a single NGTC Proton Gen-2 in the second half of the 2011 season, with a debut at Snetterton. The car was driven by Daniel Welch.
 Triple 8 entered a single car for James Nash at Rockingham.
 Thorney Motorsport entered the series at the Silverstone round, running NGTC Vauxhall Insignia for the team owner John Thorne.

Race calendar and results
All races were held in the United Kingdom. The calendar was announced by the championship organisers on 8 September 2010, with no major changes from 2010.

Championship standings

No driver may collect more than one "Lead a Lap" point per race no matter how many laps they lead.
Race 1 polesitter receives 1 point.

Drivers' Championship
(key)

Note: bold signifies pole position (1 point given in first race only, and race 2 and 3 poles are based on race results), italics signifies fastest lap (1 point given all races) and * signifies at least one lap in the lead (1 point given all races).

Manufacturers'/Constructors' Championship

Teams' Championship

Independents' Trophy

Independent Teams' Trophy

Notes

References

External links 
Official website of the British Touring Car Championship
Meeting results from BTCC.net
Brands Hatch Indy
Donington Park
Thruxton
Oulton Park
Croft
Snetterton
Knockhill
Rockingham
Brands Hatch GP
Silverstone
TouringCarTimes

British Touring Car Championship seasons
Touring Car Championship